Events from the year 1145 in Ireland.

Incumbents
High King: Toirdelbach Ua Conchobair

Deaths
 Ruaidhri Ua Flaithbheartaigh, King of Iar Connacht

References

 
1140s in Ireland
Ireland
Years of the 12th century in Ireland